This is a list of nations that are represented by lacrosse national governing bodies. This list indicates which countries have participated in the five international lacrosse competitions sponsored by World Lacrosse, which oversees international lacrosse.

Table key

World Lacrosse members

Source:

Independent national organizing bodies

References

Notes

 
lacrosse, national
Governing